Asia Muhammad and Taylor Townsend were the defending champions, but both players chose not to participate.

Jovana Jakšić and Catalina Pella won the title, defeating Madison Brengle and Danielle Collins in the final, 6–4, 7–6(7–5).

Seeds

Draw

References
Main Draw

Boyd Tinsley Women's Clay Court Classic - Doubles